Aalborg Boldspilklub A/S (also AaB A/S) is a Danish sports corporation based in Aalborg Denmark. Founded on 1 July 1987, AaB A/S is most noted for ownership of the professional football (soccer) team AaB Fodbold. Other holdings has until included professional handball and hockey teams, a retail sports chain, a conference and sports center and a sports college but all of these activities has been closed or sold off due to financial problems. The company's stock is traded on the Copenhagen Stock Exchange as AaB.

Management
AaB A/S is headed by director Lynge Jacobsen and seven board members, with Finn V. Nielsen as chairman of the board.
Each department has its own division director.

Shareholders
At 31 December 2008 Aalborg Boldspilklub A/S had about 9,600 shareholders.
Two companies owned more than 5%. They are Nordjyske Holding A/S with 19.8% and Sebc Holding ApS with 5.3%.

References

External links
AaB stock profile at Børsen A/S

Aalborg Boldspilklub
Entertainment companies of Denmark
Companies based in Aalborg